Sindkheda Assembly constituency seat is one of the five constituencies of the Maharashtra Vidhan Sabha (legislative assembly) located in the Dhule district of the state in western India.

This Vidhan Sabha segment is a part of the Dhule Lok Sabha constituency along with five other Vidhan Sabha segments, namely, Dhule Rural and Dhule City from the Dhule district and Malegaon Central, Malegaon Outer and Baglan in the Nashik district.

Members of Legislative Assembly
 1951: Narayanrao Sahadevrao Patil, Indian National Congress
 1957: Sonawane Shankar Gorakh, Praja Socialist Party
 1962: Narayanrao Sahadevrao Patil, Indian National Congress
 1967: Narayanrao Sahadevrao Patil, Indian National Congress
 1972: Lilabai Uttamrao Patil, Indian National Congress
 1978: Shisode Madhukarrao Dipchand, Independent
 1980: Patil Rangrao Madhavrao, Indian National Congress (I)
 1985: Rajput Mangalsing Nimji, Independent
 1990: Bhadane Dattatray Waman, Indian National Congress
 1995: Rajput Mangalsing Nimji, Janata Dal
 1999: Patil Ramkrushna Dodha, Shiv Sena
 2004: Annasaheb D.V. Patil, Independent
 2009: Jayakumar Jitendrasinh Rawal, Bharatiya Janata Party
 2014: Jayakumar Jitendrasinh Rawal, Bharatiya Janata Party
 2019: Jayakumar Jitendrasinh Rawal, Bharatiya Janata Party

Election results

Assembly Elections 2009

Assembly Elections 2014

See also
 Sindkheda
 List of constituencies of Maharashtra Vidhan Sabha

References

Assembly constituencies of Maharashtra
Dhule district